XELBL-AM/XHLBL-FM is a radio station on 1350 AM and 93.9 FM in San Luis Río Colorado, Sonora. It is owned by Radio Grupo OIR and is known as Radio Centro with a romantic format.

History

XEXV-AM received its concession on March 5, 1965. It was owned by Enrique Escalera García and came to air as a 500-watt daytimer. The callsign was changed by 1972, and García sold XELBL to Radiodifusora del Colorado in 1978. The current concessionaire acquired the station in 1994 and the station increased power to 8,000 watts.

In 2018, Radio Grupo OIR selected XEMW 1260 and XELBL to migrate to FM. Coinciding with the launch of XHLBL-FM 93.9, a format shuffle ensued in which the Río Digital pop format moved from XHDY-FM 107.1 to XHLBL, and XELBL's old Radio Centro romantic format moved to the newly migrated XHEMW-FM 91.1. In February 2019, XHEMW and XHLBL swapped formats, with Radio Centro moving to 93.9 and Río Digital to 91.1.

References

Radio stations in Sonora
Radio stations established in 1965